Wachendorfia multiflora is a species of herbaceous plant in the genus Wachendorfia. It is endemic to the Western Cape. It also known as the Kleinrooikanol in Afrikaans.

Conservation status 
Wachendorfia multiflora is classified as Least Concern.

References

External links 
 
 

Endemic flora of South Africa
Flora of South Africa
Flora of the Cape Provinces
Haemodoraceae